"This Is Your Land" is a song by Scottish rock band Simple Minds from their album Street Fighting Years, released as the second single on 10 April 1989. The song features Lou Reed as guest vocalist. The single reached #13 on the UK singles chart. The music video was shot in Spain.

The song was praised by David Sinclair of Q magazine as part of a five-star album review given to Street Fighting Years. Sinclair wrote: "The utterly beguiling melody of 'This Is Your Land', featuring a deadpan Lou Reed, cloaks a stinging rebuke on the issue of the environment while gently leading the listener up towards the panoramic splendour of the instrumental coda."

Track listings
 7" Single
 "This Is Your Land" - 6:22
 "Saturday Girl"  - 6:09

 12", Cassette & CD Singles
This Is Your Land" - 6:22
Saturday Girl" - 6:09
"Year Of The Dragon" - 3:06

Charts

Weekly charts

Year-end charts

References

External links
Simple Minds - "This Is Your Land" at Discogs

1989 singles
Music videos shot in Spain
Simple Minds songs
Song recordings produced by Trevor Horn
Songs written by Jim Kerr
Song recordings produced by Stephen Lipson
1989 songs
Virgin Records singles
Songs written by Charlie Burchill
Songs written by Mick MacNeil